Gardabani is a city of 11,650 residents (2021) in the southern Georgian region of Kvemo Kartli and is the administrative centre of the Gardabani Municipality. Until 1947 Gardabani was known as Karayazi and the city status was granted in 1969, after a thermal power plant was built for Tbilisi in the 1960s causing rapid growth. Since then more plower plants have been built and the city nowadays supplies almost all thermally generated electricity in the country.

History 

Gardabani was an inconspicuous village in the southern Georgian countryside until Russian rule in the 19th century. With the administrative division of the South Caucasus by the Russians, the settlement, at the time with the Azerbaijani name Karayaz(i) (often spelled Karaia in Georgian; also known under the Russian exonym Karatapa), became the namesake and center of Karayaz uchastok (Russian: Караязский участок) within the Tiflis Uyezd (part of Tiflis Governorate). Karayazi was mainly populated by Azerbaijanis, who at the time were referred to as Tatars like other Turkic-speaking ethnic groups. In 1886, 94% of the more than 5,000 residents of Karayazi uchastok were of Azerbaijani descent. Upon completion of the Tiflis - Baku railway line in 1883 a station opened in Karayaz.

Karayazi was on the main attack route from Azerbaijan during the Soviet invasion of the Democratic Republic of Georgia in February 1921, when it attempted to pass armored trains along Karayazi to Tiflis. By the end of February the Soviets captured Tiflis and soon incorporated Georgia as the Georgian SSR. In 1938 the Karayazi raion was separated from the Tiflis Okrug, making the village of Karayazi the administrative center of the new raion. In 1947 the name was changed from Karayazi to Gardabani, and in 1969 city rights were granted. With the local governance reforms in 2006 all raions were converted to municipalities and Gardabani remained the administrative center of the transformed municipality.

Population

At the beginning of 2021, Gardabani had a population of 11,650, an increase of more than 8% since the 2014 census. According to the 2014 census, the ethnic composition is 63% Azerbaijanis, followed by 30% Georgians. Almost all Assyrians in the municipality live in Gardabani city (almost 300, 2.5%). Other minorities are Armenians (1.9%), Russians (1.4%) and a few dozen Ukrainians, Ossetians and Pontic Greeks.

In 1979, 49% of the city's residents were of Azerbaijani origin, while the proportion of Georgians was 17%. At the time, more Russians (15%), Armenians (5%) and Greeks (4%) lived in the city, who mostly emigrated with the dissolution of the Soviet Union.

Assyrians 
A relatively large Assyrian community lives in Gardabani. After the Assyrian genocide in 1915, survivors from the Anatolian region of Bohtan fled to the Russian Empire via Yerevan and eventually, after the revolutions and wars of that period, settled ina few villages in the Azerbaijan SSR. However, they never became Soviet citizens, and were deported to Siberia in 1949 where they lived in exile until 1956. The Assyrians who had been deported from the Azerbaijan town Ağstafa were not allowed to return by its residents, so they ended up in Gardabani.

Economy  

Since then, more plants have been built, and currently the site hosts several gas- and coal-fired power stations that are responsible for almost all thermal electricity production in Georgia. After the 2003 Rose Revolution, efforts were made to expand electricity production for greater energy independence, but also to cope with the energy crisis that plagued the country for years. In 2006 a gas-fired power plant with a capacity of 110 MW opened in Gardabani, the first new power plant since the country's independence.

Since 2012, a further step-by-step investment in the country's energy independence was launched with the construction of new combined cycle power plants in Gardabani. Hydroelectric power plants are responsible for 75-80% of the electricity production in the mountainous country, some of which is seasonal, but additional imports were still required in addition to thermal power production. In addition, energy consumption in the country is increasing and outdated (hydropower) plants are not efficient enough.

In 2015, Georgia's first combined cycle power plant, the 230 MW Gardabani-1, opened. At the beginning of 2020, Gardabani-2 combined cycle power plant of 230 MW followed. In September 2020, the construction of the 272 MW Gardabani-3 combined cycle power plant was announced, and a year later the 250 MW Gardabani-4 combined cycle power plant.

In 2005, a pumping station for the Baku–Tbilisi–Ceyhan pipeline opened near Gardabani, completing the Georgian sector of the pipeline. Presidents Mikheil Saakashvili (Georgia), Ilham Aliyev (Azerbaijan) and Ahmet Sezer (Turkey) attended the inauguration.

Transport 
Only one national route passes through Gardabani, the Sh66. This is a connection from Rustavi via Gardabani to the Vakhtangisi border crossing with Azerbaijan. With just over 69,000 foreign travelers in 2019, this is a secondary border crossing.

The Tbilisi - Baku railway line which opened in 1883 has a station on the outskirts of Gardabani. It serves as a border station for the scheduled Tbilisi - Baku connection.

Born in Gardabani 
 Soyun Sadykov (1960), Russian politician, headed Federal National Cultural Autonomy of Azerbaijanis in Russia, confidante Vladimir Putin;
 Gocha Jamarauli (1971), soccerplayer;
 Ilgar Mirzayev (1973-2020), Azerbaijani military officer, National Hero of Azerbaijan, and colonel serving Azerbaijani Armed Forces until his death during July 2020 Armenian–Azerbaijani clashes;
 Giorgi Matiashvili (1977), Georgian major general and Chief of Georgian Defense Forces (2020-);
 Zabit Samedov (1984), kickboxer;
 Chingiz Allazov (1993), kickboxer.

See also

 List of power stations in Georgia (country)

References

Cities and towns in Kvemo Kartli